Erwin Lorenzo Ávalos (born 27 April 1983 in Caazapá) is a Paraguayan football striker currently playing for Sol de América.

Ávalos made his professional debut in 2001 for Cerro Porteño in Paraguay where he was part of two championship winning campaigns in 2001 and 2004. He also was the Paraguayan 1st Division topscorer in 2003.

In 2005 Ávalos spent some time on loan in Santos in Brazil before returning to Cerro.

In 2006 Ávalos joined Club Toluca in Mexico and joined Racing Club in 2007.

Avalos returned to Cerro once again in 2008 and in January 2010 he joined Argentine club Chacarita Juniors.

He returned to Paraguay within six months and then re-joined Cerro Porteño.

Prior to begin 2011 season he moved to Sol de América.

Titles

References

External links
 Football-Lineups player profile

1983 births
Living people
People from Caazapá
Paraguayan footballers
Paraguay under-20 international footballers
Association football forwards
Paraguayan Primera División players
Argentine Primera División players
Liga MX players
Cerro Porteño players
Santos FC players
Deportivo Toluca F.C. players
Racing Club de Avellaneda footballers
Chacarita Juniors footballers
Club Sol de América footballers
Club Atlético 3 de Febrero players
Paraguayan expatriate footballers
Expatriate footballers in Mexico
Expatriate footballers in Brazil
Expatriate footballers in Argentina